White House is a 2010 Filipino supernatural horror film directed by Topel Lee and starring Iza Calzado, Lovi Poe, Maricar Reyes and Gabby Concepcion. It was distributed by Regal Entertainment. It features the famous Laperal White House in Baguio that was said to be haunted. The movie has a IMDB rating of 5.0/10.

Synopsis
A new horror reality show was set to be held at the haunted Laperal White House. Jet (Gabby Concepcion), a gifted and renowned spirit questor was hired by Coreen (Maricar Reyes), the show's producer as a guide. But as the show begins, a dark secret within the house starts to unfold. The show's participants start to get haunted by a mysterious lady in black (Iza Calzado) one by one.

Cast

Production

See also
 List of ghost films

References

External links
 

2010 films
2010 horror films
Philippine haunted house films
Films set in country houses
2010s Tagalog-language films
Philippine supernatural horror films
Regal Entertainment films
2010s English-language films